Yukhu were an Azerbaijani rock band based in Sumgayit, that were active from 1988 to 2001. They became one of the most popular Azerbaijani rock bands during the 1990s. The group released three studio albums.

Yukhu became known for singing exclusively in the Azerbaijani language.

History
In 1989, the group won the "Golden Autumn" musical festival with their song "Xəzərin sahilində". Part of the prize was to record a demo tape, which was carried out in Baku in December that year, featuring "Xəzərin sahilində", three other songs and an instrumental composition.

In mid-1990, Azar Aliev, propaganda director of the Young Communist League of Azerbaijan, took Yukhu's demo tape, as well as tapes by two other popular Azeri rock bands, Dervish and Taj, to the directors of the Mayence Rock festival in Mainz, West Germany. Yukhu were selected to appear on the festival's official album for that year, with their song "Ana" (Mother), although the band name was listed as "IOXY" (a misreading of Юху, the band's Russian name). Yukhu never ended up performing at the festival - Dervish ended up making the trip to Germany in their stead.

1991 saw the group film a video for their song "Xəzərin sahilində", directed by Vahid Nakhysh. A second demo tape was also recorded that year, featuring five new songs with a more pop-like style. A French manager, Pascal, who had previously met them in 1989 at Golden Autumn, began to revive the group's original plans to go to France. In 1991, Naghdaliyev, Emin and Eyvazov left Azerbaijan and moved to Turkey and began to work in a shop selling jackets. The owner of the shop was able to set the group up with a residency at the TUAL pub, and the group began performing, initially as an instrumental trio. Nematov, who was studying in Moscow at the time, followed his bandmates to Turkey shortly after.

A friend of the band, Tevfik Yılmaz, introduced the band to İsmail Uzelli, owner of the Uzelli record label, and the band's two demo tapes were combined and released as their debut album Xəzərin sahilində on 11 October 1993. Around this time, they began to record their second album, Sumqayıt, which was released in early 1994. Pascal also invited them to France, but they never made the trip (there are conflicting stories as to why) and remained in Turkey for the rest of their career.

Yuxu's final Azerbaijani performance took place in Baku on 31 January 1993, performing as an instrumental trio at the RokOko festival. They won second place.

In 1994, Nematov left the band and returned to Moscow to complete his studies. He was replaced by Turkish pop singer Serkan Civelek. In 1996, Civelek himself left the band and was replaced by Zaur Abdullayev. Abdullayev led the band in recording what would become the group's final album, Ölümə çare yox, in 1998. It would not be released until 2001.

After Yukhu 
Yukhu split after 1999 İzmit earthquake due to collapse of their last studio, ADA Muzik. Naghdaliyev and Eyvazov stayed in Turkey. Eyvazov became a tattoo artist and Naghdaliyev continued to involve himself in music. Later Eyvazov returned to Baku and currently lives there. Ibrahim Emin also returned from Turkey in 2003 to form the group Sirr in 2004. He became bassist of the band until its split in 2015, and remained in Azerbaijan for the rest of his life. However, the former members claim the band has not disbanded, but due to members living in different countries, the band cannot reunite.

Emin died on 2 July 2019. On 20 September 2020, Xəzərin sahilində was released on vinyl.

Members
 Final line-up
 Ibrahim Emin − bass guitar, backing vocals (1988–2001) (died 2019)
 Namig Naghdaliyev − guitar (1988–2001)
 Chingiz Eyvazov − drums (1988–2001)
 Zaur Abdullayev − vocals (1998-2001)

 Former
 Jasur Nematov − vocals (1988–1994)
 Serkan Civelek - vocals (1994-1996)

Discography
"Xəzərin sahilində/Хәзәрин саһилиндә" (On the Coast of the Caspian Sea, 1993)
"Sumqayıt/Сумгајыт" (Sumgait, 1994)
"Ölümə çarə yox/Өлүмә чарә јох" (There is No Cure for Death, 2001)

References

Azerbaijani rock music groups
Musical groups established in 1988
Azerbaijani hard rock musical groups
Azerbaijani heavy metal musical groups
Soviet heavy metal musical groups